The 18th Indian Division was an infantry division of the British Indian Army that saw active service in the First World War.  It took part in the Mesopotamian campaign and formed part of the occupation force for Iraq post-war.  The division was not reformed for the Second World War.

History

The 18th Indian Division was formed in Mesopotamia on 24 December 1917, although the last of its brigades (55th) was not formed until January 1918.  Many of the division's units transferred directly from India so time was needed for them to become acclimatized.  It remained in Mesopotamia for the rest of the First World War, taking part in the action at Fat-ha Gorge on the Little Zab (23–26 October 1918) and the Battle of Sharqat (28–30 October 1918) under the command of I Corps.

At the end of the war, the 18th Division was chosen to form part of the occupation force for Iraq.  It took part in the Iraq Rebellion in 1920 and was broken up in the following year.

Order of battle
The division commanded the following units, although not all of them served at the same time:

53rd Indian Brigade
 1/9th Battalion, Duke of Cambridge's Own (Middlesex Regiment)
 1st Battalion, 89th Punjabis 
 1st Battalion, 3rd Queen Alexandra's Own Gurkha Rifles 
 1st Battalion, 7th Gurkha Rifles
 207th Machine Gun Company
 53rd Light Trench Mortar Battery

54th Indian Brigade
 1/5th Battalion, Queen's Own (Royal West Kent Regiment) 
 25th Punjabis 
 1st Battalion, 39th Garhwal Rifles 
 52nd Sikhs (Frontier Force) 
 238th Machine Gun Company
 54th Light Trench Mortar Battery

55th Indian Brigade
 1/5th Battalion, East Surrey Regiment
 1st Battalion, 10th Jats
 87th Punjabis
 1st Battalion, 94th Russell's Infantry
 116th Mahrattas
 1st Battalion, 5th Gurkha Rifles (Frontier Force)
 239th Machine Gun Company
 55th Light Trench Mortar Battery

Divisional Artillery
 CCCXXXVI Brigade, Royal Field Artillery (A, B, C and D (H) Batteries)
 CCCXXXVII Brigade, Royal Field Artillery (A, B, C and 341st (H) Batteries)
 X.18 Medium Trench Mortar Battery
 18th Divisional Ammunition Column

Engineers and Pioneers
 2nd, 5th, 6th and 8th Field Companies, 1st King George's Own Sappers and Miners
 18th Division Signal Company, Royal Engineers Signal Service
 106th Hazara Pioneers
 1st Battalion, 32nd Sikh Pioneers

Divisional Troops
 249th Machine Gun Company
 18th Machine Gun Battalion
 37th, 38th, 39th and 40th Combined Field Ambulances, RAMC
 No. 12 Mobile Veterinary Section, AVC
 18th Division Train, ASC

Commanders
The division was commanded from 7 January 1918 by Major-General H.D. Fanshawe and from 12 March 1919 by Major-General Theodore Fraser.

See also

 List of Indian divisions in World War I

Notes

References

Bibliography

External links
 
 

British Indian Army divisions
Indian World War I divisions
Military units and formations established in 1917
Military units and formations disestablished in 1921